Le Pub (also known as Le Public Space) is a bar, restaurant and nightclub located in Newport, South Wales. It opened in 1992 on nearby Caxton Place, and became a popular live music venue as part of the Newport music scene along with TJ's, later relocating as a co-operative on High Street.

History 

Le Pub has been a popular music venue in the city for 30 years, though historically overshadowed by its more famed neighbour TJ's on Clarence Place, which had attracted names such as David Bowie and Kurt Cobain during the city's 'new Seattle' era.

While the city enjoyed a thriving scene in the 1980s and 1990s, the decline of industry and the growth of the nearby Cardiff music scene had impacted Newport hard. TJ's closed in 2010 and at one point relocated as a legacy site named El Siecco's, also on High Street. However this only lasted a few months. 

Le Pub also faced difficulty during the 2000s. It existed at its home on Caxton Place for 24 years and 11 months but was forced to sell its site and move to new premises.

Present 

With assistance from Newport City Council, the business restarted as a community interest company offering shares to friends and patrons of the old venue, and providing it with necessary finance to refurbish new premises and re-open.

It moved to High Street on July 29th 2017 on the site of the old The Page pub (previously the South Wales Argus office), aided by a team of volunteers. It opened offering space in the city for creative projects, a gallery, rehearsal rooms, office space and a small cinema space. It has now operated in Newport city centre for 30 years.

It opens until 2am most weekdays and 3am on Friday and Saturday evenings and offers a wide range of independent and international beers and spirits. It is also praised by Eat Out Vegan Wales as being a recommended vegan and 100% vegetarian eatery.

See also 
 Music of Newport
 Music of Wales
 Newport, Wales
 Newport city centre
 TJ's
 Diverse Vinyl
 El Sieco's

References

External links 
 Official website

Newport, Wales
Nightclubs in Wales
Culture in Newport, Wales
Former music venues in Wales
Landmarks in Newport, Wales
Music venues in Newport, Wales
Community interest companies in Wales